"Pseudomonas helianthi" is a Gram-negative plant pathogenic bacterium that infects a variety of plants. It was once considered a pathovar of Pseudomonas syringae, but following DNA-relatedness studies, it was recognized as a separate species and P. syringae pv. tagetis was incorporated into it, as well. Since no official name has yet been given, it is referred to by the epithet  'Pseudomonas helianthi' .

Pathovars 
 "Pseudomonas helianthi" pv. helianthi attacks sunflowers (Helianthus annuus).
 "Pseudomonas helianthi" pv. tagetis attacks marigolds (Tagetes erecta).

References 

Pseudomonadales
Bacterial plant pathogens and diseases
Ornamental plant pathogens and diseases
Undescribed species